San Cristobal Island may refer to:

 San Cristóbal Island, the easternmost island in the Galápagos archipelago
 Makira (formerly San Cristobal), the largest island of Makira-Ulawa Province in the Solomon Islands
 Saint Kitts and Nevis, in Spanish called San Cristóbal y Nieves.

See also
 Cristóbal Island, an island in the Bocas del Toro archipelago in Panama